This is the order of battle during the battle around convoys HX 229 and SC 122 from 16 to 20 March 1943.

Allied forces

Convoy HX 229

Ships in Convoy HX 229

Escort Group B-4

  Destroyers:   (SOE till 18th),  (SOE from 18th)

Ships in Convoy SC 122

B-5 Escort Group

 Destroyers:  (SOE), 
 Frigate: 
 Naval Trawler: 

Reinforcements

 Destroyers: ,  
 USCG Cutter:

Axis forces
Raubgraf

   
 

Stürmer

 ,  
 

Dranger

  
  
 , 
 , 
 
 ,

References

Bibliography

Stephen Roskill : The War at Sea 1939–1945   Vol II (1956).  ISBN (none)
Dan van der Vat : The Atlantic Campaign (1988).  
Arnold Hague : The Allied Convoy System 1939–1945 (2000).  (Canada);  (UK)
Axel Neistle  : German U-Boat Losses during World War II  (1998). 
Paul Kemp  : U-Boats Destroyed  ( 1997)

External links
HX 229 at convoyweb
SC 122 at convoyweb
http://uboat.net/ops/convoys/convoys.php?convoy=HX-229
http://uboat.net/ops/convoys/convoys.php?convoy=SC-122

World War II orders of battle
HX229